Rachel Livia Elizondo McLish (born 21 June 1955) is an American female bodybuilding champion, actress, and author.

Early life and education
McLish was born as Raquel Livia Elizondo in 1955 in Harlingen, Texas, the second-youngest daughter born. Her father Rafael was of Mexican ancestry and her mother is named Raquel Elizondo. She attended the Harlingen High School, where she was a cheerleader and twice-named Cardinal’s Football Sweetheart. She graduated from high school in 1973. In 1978, she graduated from the Pan American University with a degree in physiology and health and nutrition.

Bodybuilding career

Amateur
While attending college, McLish worked at a health club in McAllen, Texas. When she graduated from college, she and the health club manager formed a partnership and founded the Sport Palace Association in Harlingen. With the success of the Sport Palace Association, she opened two more facilities in Corpus Christi and Brownsville in 1980. She was inspired to compete in bodybuilding thanks to Lisa Lyon and the club manager, Javier Gutierrez, who would show her magazines of female bodybuilders and encourage her to compete. She decided to compete because the opening of her new health club would coincide with a women's bodybuilding contest and bodybuilding would give her a platform to promote fitness to women.

Professional
McLish merits special historical significance in the sport of women’s bodybuilding. In 1980, she won the inaugural United States Championships, as well as beating Auby Paulick to win that year’s first-ever IFBB Ms. Olympia contest. After her 1980 Olympia win, no woman appeared on more magazine covers for the next five years. She got sponsored by Dynamics Health Equipment Manufacturing Corporation. These breakthrough victories, together with her visual appeal, brought women’s bodybuilding a further rush of media attention, which had been jump-started into action by Lisa Lyon.

In a competitive career that spanned only four years, McLish proved a resilient force, never placing lower than third in any contest she entered. In 1981, she lost her Ms. Olympia title to Kike Elomaa, because her physique was not as defined as usual. At the 1982 Ms. Olympia, she beat Carla Dunlap to reclaim her title. Both Paulick and Dunlap brought more muscle than McLish in those respective contests, but neither could match McLish's overall appeal. Dunlap defeated her in the 1983 Caesar's World Cup contest. She finished a controversial second behind Cory Everson in the 1984 Ms. Olympia. As quoted by several magazines covering the event, some competitors expressed surprise at McLish's high placement because she didn't carry the muscle mass carried by many of the top women. Though Dunlap, who finished fifth, was the defending Ms. Olympia, the cover of the March 1985 Strength Training for Beauty's March 1985 cover declared "Cory dethrones Rachel."

Retirement
After finishing second at the 1984 IFBB Ms. Olympia, McLish retired from competitive bodybuilding.

Legacy
McLish was the first winner of the Ms. Olympia title. She is one of bodybuilding’s most recognizable personalities. In January 1999, she was inducted into the IFBB Hall of Fame.

Contest history
 1980 US Bodybuilding Championship – 1st
 1980 Frank Zane Invitational – 2nd
 1980 IFBB Ms. Olympia – 1st
 1981 IFBB Ms. Olympia – 2nd
 1982 Pro World Championship – 1st
 1982 IFBB Ms. Olympia – 1st
 1983 Caesars World Cup – 3rd
 1984 IFBB Ms. Olympia – 2nd

Personal life
McLish is a Christian and describes herself as a compassionate conservative. While attending Pan American University, she met John P. McLish, whom she married on February 3, 1979. They later divorced. In 1990, she married film producer Ron Samuels. She and her husband lived in Rancho Mirage, California in 1996. In 2008, she sold her house for $3 million to Boston Red Sox player Coco Crisp.

Motion picture career
McLish was featured in the 1985 documentary Pumping Iron II: The Women which focused on her participation in the 1983 Caesar’s World Cup. She also acted in the movies Getting Physical (1984), Aces: Iron Eagle III (1992) and Raven Hawk (1996). These involved her acting the part of a physically strong woman. She was one of the first women to take such a role. She was also a star in Herb Alpert's 'Red Hot' music video. She co-starred alongside Arnold Schwarzenegger in the fitness instructional video Shape Up (1982).

Author
McLish has authored two books on weight training for women that made the New York Times bestseller list – Flex Appeal, by Rachel, and Perfect Parts. She is now working on two books that focus on fitness and nutrition.

References

External links
IFBB Hall of Fame profile

Rachel McLish Gallery
Internet Pinball Database

| colspan = 3 align = center | Ms. Olympia
|-
| width = 30% align = center | Preceded by:-
| width = 40% align = center | First (1980)
| width = 30% align = center | Succeeded by:Kike Elomaa
|-
| width = 30% align = center | Preceded by:Kike Elomaa
| width = 40% align = center | Second (1982)
| width = 30% align = center | Succeeded by:Carla Dunlap

1955 births
Actresses from California
Actresses from Texas
American female bodybuilders
American sportspeople of Mexican descent
Living people
People from Harlingen, Texas
People from Rancho Mirage, California
Professional bodybuilders
Sportspeople from California
Sportspeople from Riverside County, California
Sportspeople from Texas
21st-century American women
American actresses of Mexican descent